Hanga Dam, is an earth-fill dam on Hanga river in Hanga village in Parner taluka of Ahmednagar district of state of Maharashtra in India.

Specifications

Purpose
 Irrigation
 Drinking water for neatest villages

See also
 Dams in Maharashtra

References

Dams in Ahmednagar district
Earth-filled dams
Dams completed in 1978
1978 establishments in Maharashtra